Bishop Loughlin Memorial High School is a private, Roman Catholic, co-educational, college-preparatory high school located at 357 Clermont Avenue in the Ft. Greene neighborhood of Brooklyn, New York. The school serves students in grades 9 through 12. Loughlin was founded in 1851 and was the first high school in the Diocese of Brooklyn (1853), but today is run independently by the Christian Brothers in the Lasallian educational tradition.

Today, the school graduates 100% of its senior students with at least 98% of graduates matriculating to college each year. In 2018, Loughlin enrolled nearly 650 students, making it the fifth-largest Catholic high school in Brooklyn and Queens. The school had 38 full-time teachers, two part-time teachers and four full-time counselors. The 2017–2018 tuition was $10,050, and nearly 60% of all students were awarded financial aid or scholarships, with an average aid amount of $3,200.

History

In 1851, the De La Salle Christian Brothers assumed direction of the boys' section of what was then known as the St. James School on Jay Street in Brooklyn, the parochial school of St. James' Church. It was the first Catholic school in the Diocese of Brooklyn.

In 1926 St. James became one of three diocesan high schools for boys. In 1933 the school moved to Clermont Avenue, and was renamed Bishop Loughlin Memorial High after the Very Reverend John Loughlin, the first Roman Catholic Bishop of Brooklyn, who served from 1853 to 1891.

In 1933 the high school on Jay Street was closed and the Brothers and students transferred to the present campus of Bishop Loughlin Memorial High School. The new school was built on land originally intended for the diocesan cathedral bounded by Clermont, Greene, Lafayette, and Vanderbilt Avenues. The cornerstone of the school building erected in 1851 is now enshrined by the cafeteria entrance of the present building, a last vestige of the 81 years "Old St. James" stood downtown. The first Senior Prom was held in 1934 and the first edition of the Loughlinite, the school yearbook, appeared in 1938.

As a diocesan high school, Loughlin opened its doors to the people of the entire diocese, which included all of Long Island at that time. It has been coeducational since 1973 with the closure of a nearby diocesan girls' high school.

Location 
Bishop Loughlin Memorial High School is located in the neighborhood of Fort Greene, Brooklyn, in New York City, also home to the Brooklyn Academy of Music, the Mark Morris Dance Company and several other arts and cultural organizations.

Academics 
The curriculum and atmosphere of Loughlin are designed to meet a wide range of student abilities. Loughlin students are encouraged to develop fully their personal talents and are given opportunities to use them in service to others.

Loughlin has a graduation rate of 99% with 97% typically going to college each year.

Loughlin offers college credit opportunities through Advanced Placement Courses in: English, Environmental Science, Calculus, Music Theory, Physics, Spanish, US History, and World History.

The school provides a technology-rich environment with school-side WiFi and SmartBoard classrooms. iPads are available to all students.

In 2016, Loughlin launched a new STEM program in partnership with Project Lead The Way (PLTW), a national nonprofit organization that partners with Brooklyn Tech, among other institutions. In 2017, more than 200 students registered for courses in Engineering or Biomedical Science.

Athletics
Loughlin offers sports programs for both girls and boys, featuring 16 different sports, including rugby, soccer, and lacrosse.

Loughlin fields a strong basketball team. The boys freshman basketball team won city championships in 2017 and 2016 and the boys varsity team won the Brooklyn/Queens Diocesan championship in 2016. Alums Keith Williams, class of 2017, is now playing for the Cincinnati Bearcats in the NCAA Division 1, and Mike Boynton, class of 2001, recently became the head basketball coach at Oklahoma State.

Loughlin had a 4x4 track victory at the 2016 Millrose Games and a qualification for Nationals. Their track & field teams have garnered 21 Penn Relays high school championships, one of the highest tallies in the history of those games.

The school also has coed teams in handball, indoor and outdoor track, cross country, and bowling. Their varsity bowling team won championships in 2014 and 2015. Loughlin also offers students opportunities to participate in baseball, softball, volleyball, and cheerleading. In partnership with St. Francis College, their water polo team was the first high school team to win the Yale Invitational Tournament.

Notable alumni

 Sam Belnavis, class of 1957, automobile racing executive
 Mike Boynton, class of 2000, head basketball coach at Oklahoma State University
Khadeen Carrington (born 1995), Trinidadian-American basketball player for Hapoel Jerusalem of the Israeli Basketball Premier League
 Tom Carroll, class of 1954, professional baseball player
 Doug E. Doug, actor
 Devin Ebanks, pro basketball player currently in the Greek Basket League
 Rudy Giuliani, class of 1961, Mayor of New York City, 1994–2002; United States Attorney for the Southern District of New York under President Ronald Reagan, 1983–1989
 Ronald Holmberg, class of 1956, professional tennis player and coach
 Mark Jackson, class of 1983, professional basketball player, 2011–14 head coach of Golden State Warriors
 Pete Naton, class of 1949, professional baseball player
 The Notorious B.I.G., rapper
 Andre Riddick, basketball player
 Arthur F. Ryan, class of 1959, retired CEO and chairman, Prudential Financial
 Vincent Schiavelli, actor, food writer
 Sherrod Small, stand-up comedian
April Walker, class of 1983, owner of hip hop clothing line Walker Wear.
 Alvin Young, class of 1995, professional basketball player

References

External links

 

Educational institutions established in 1851
Lasallian schools in the United States
1851 establishments in New York (state)
Roman Catholic high schools in Brooklyn